Batman: The Brave and the Bold is an American comic book series published by DC Comics. It is based on the TV series of the same name.

Issues
Characters/teams in bold did not appear in the TV series:
 The Panic of the Composite Creature - After teaming up with Aquaman to defeat Carapax, Batman and Power Girl fight a composite monster (under the control of Lex Luthor) which is on a rampage in England.
 Attack of the Virtual Villains - After teaming up with Superman to take down the Toyman, Batman and the Blue Beetle fight the Thinker when trolls and ogres emerge from a video game and attack the real world.
 President Batman - After teaming up with Wonder Woman to defeat Doctor Psycho (who is accompanied by the Clock King, Killer Croc, the Scarecrow, and Two-Face), Batman and Green Arrow must protect the President from the Ultra-Humanite.
 Menace of the Time Thief - After teaming up with Sugar and Spike to defeat Felix Faust, Batman and Aquaman team up to stop Doctor Cyber when she plans to collapse the time stream.
 The Case of the Fractured Fairy Tale - After teaming up with the Haunted Tank to defeat the Key, Batman and Captain Marvel team up to stop the Queen of Fables, who is abducting children.
 Charge of the Army Eternal - After teaming up with Hourman to defeat the Calculator, Batman and Kid Eternity team up to fight General Immortus (assisted by the western Royal Flush Gang). The G.I. Robot, the Shining Knight, the Vigilante, and the Viking Prince make appearances as spirits.
 The Secret of the Doomsday Design - After helping Olympian defeat Circe, Batman helps the Doom Patrol in fighting Mad Mod when he steals some of the Doom Patrol's signature clothes in a plan to integrate them into "suits of doom". Beast Boy made an appearance as the member of Doom Patrol and Animal-Vegetable-Mineral Man makes a cameo appearance.
 Batman Vs. The Yeti - After helping Rising Sun fight a gang of ninjas, Batman teams up with the Great Ten to fight an army of yetis.
 The Tale of the Catman - After teaming up with many magic-using superheroes (consisting of Doctor Fate, Doctor Occult, Sargon the Sorcerer, Mento, and Zatanna) to defeat the Void, Batman has an unlikely team-up with the Catman when it comes to stopping villains like the Penguin, the Riddler, the Joker, and Two-Face.
 Attack of the Colossal Bat-Monster - Hugo Strange has turned Batman into a giant monster that rampages through Gotham City. Now the Green Arrow and the Atom must stop the Bat-Monster, change it back to Batman, and defeat Hugo Strange.
 The Fearsome Fangs Strike Again - After defeating the Sportsmaster with the help of the Huntress, Batman and Green Arrow team up to prevent the Terrible Trio from obtaining a totem that will give them ultimate power.
 Final Christmas - While stopping the Calendar Man's latest scheme, Batman is teleported to Rann to help Adam Strange save the universe, and Christmas, from imminent destruction at the hands of the Psions.
 Night of the Batmen - When Batman breaks his leg during a mission with Angel and the Ape to apprehend some criminals, Aquaman, Captain Marvel, Green Arrow, and Plastic Man cover for Batman to stop Batman's enemies (like Bane, Killer Croc, Deadshot, the Penguin, the Catwoman, and the Joker) from taking the opportunity to commit crimes. This comic's story was adapted into an episode in the third season of the show, with some differences.
 Captured by Mister Camera - After teaming up with Plastic Man to take down the Scarecrow, Batman teams up with Huntress to battle Mr. Camera.
 Minute Mystery - After teaming up with Super-Hip and Brother Power the Geek to stop the Mad Mod, Batman and the Flash compete to see who is the "world's fastest detective." The Fiddler, Paul Gambi and Jay Garrick also make appearances.
 Egg Hunt or: The Evil of Egghead - Batman must rescue Teen Titans members Kid Flash, Wonder Girl and Speedy from Nocturna. When Wonder Girl reveals that Wonder Woman has been trying to contact her afterwards, Batman joins her to fight Egghead and Egg Fu.
 A Batman's Work is Never Done - A week in the life of Batman takes him on adventures with Metamorpho (against Mr. Element), the Green Lantern Corps (against Mongul), Merry, Girl of 1,000 Gimmicks (against the Toyman), Jonah Hex and Bat Lash, Hawkman and Etrigan the Demon (against the Gentleman Ghost), the Inferior Five, and the Creeper (against the Scarecrow).
 All in the Mind - Batman teams up with Martian Manhunter to prevent an invasion from Mars by the White Martians.
 Emerald Knight - Batman teams up with the Green Lantern Corps to prevent the Cyborg Superman from killing Hal Jordan and taking over the universe.
 Solving this Mystery... ...Will Take a Miracle - Big Barda seeks Batman's help when Mister Miracle goes missing and the Female Furies attack New Genesis.
 The Menace Known as Robert - After teaming up with the Lady Blackhawks to take down King Rex and his Dinosaur Gang, Batman and Hal Jordan team up to stop a creature that emits yellow energy and can mutate living things who calls himself Robert.
 Atlantis Attacked - Batman teams up with Aquaman when the Ocean Master attacks Atlantis.

After issue #22, Batman: The Brave and the Bold was re-branded as The All-New Batman: The Brave and the Bold and started with a new #1. The title dropped The All-New as of #9.

 Bottle of the Planets - After teaming up with the Black Canary to defeat the Joker, Batman and Superman shrink investigate a string of robberies inside the Bottle City of Kandor and soon discover that the robberies are committed by Et-Rog.
 That Holiday Feeling - Batman and Captain Marvel fight the Psycho-Pirate.
 Mirror, Mirror... - Batman and Flash fight the Mad Hatter and Mirror Master in a mirror world. Printed over two issues in UK.
 The Bride and the Bold - Batman and Wonder Woman get married? This is caused by Aphrodite in order to make the two of them fall in love. Even though a wedding is set up, Batman, Wonder Woman, and the superhero guests have to deal with some supervillain wedding crashers.
 Man-hunted - Batman and Guy Gardner team up to fight the Manhunters. 
 Now You See Me - Batman and the Martian Manhunter team up to fight Clayface.
 Shadows & Light - The teaser features Batman helping the Teen Titans against the Time Trapper. At the start of his career, Batman ends up running into Gotham City's original protector Green Lantern.
 Under The Sea - Batman and Aquaman team-up to search for the artifact of the redeeming pirate Captain Fear's ghost and must overcome any obstacles, which also include Black Manta and the Fisherman.
 3:10 To Thanagar - When Batman and Hawkman take down a criminal, they must transfer the criminal to Thanagar while preventing the criminal's gang from freeing their leader.
 Help Wanted - All Joe wanted was a job and ends up working for different villains (consisting of Calculator, Clock King, Ocean Master, and Toyman) where he has encounters with Batman, Superman, Green Arrow, and Aquaman.
 Out of Time - Batman and Jonah Hex end up in 19th Century Gotham City.
 Trick or Treat - On Halloween, Batman and Zatanna end up solving a break-in at the House of Mystery where they end up dealing with Klarion the Witch Boy when he summons the Blockbuster, Dala, Doctor Destiny, Hugo Strange and his Monster Men,  the Man-Bat, the Monk, Professor Milo's Werewolves, and Solomon Grundy.
 Batman Dies at Dawn - After Nightwing helps Roy Harper defeat the Royal Flush Gang, he is teleported away by the Phantom Stranger who has reached through space and time in order to gather everyone who has ever been called "Boy Wonder" like Jason Todd, Tim Drake, Stephanie Brown, Carrie Kelley, and Damian Wayne. Due to Batman being wounded in Crime Alley due to a bad judgement call, the different Boy Wonders have to infiltrate the League of Assassins' hideout in order to gain access to the Lazarus Pits.
 Small Miracles - After teaming up with Blue Beetle to fight Crazy Quilt, Doctor Spectro and the Rainbow Raider, Batman comes to the aid of the Ragman when there is unrest in Gotham City's slums during Hanukkah.
 No Exit - Mister Miracle ends up coming to the aid of Batman when he ends up in a death trap that he can't get out of. The trap was devised by DeSaad and Doctor Bedlam.
 Love at First Mite (final issue) - On Valentine's Day, Bat-Mite develops a crush on Batgirl. Afterwards, Bat-Mite finds out that the comic is canceled and reflects on the team-ups he will never see (which include the Dingbats of Danger Street, Super-Turtle and the Space Cabbie). Batman reassures him by pointing out that he can still read the back issues.

Young Justice / Batman: The Brave and the Bold: Super Sampler
This was released for Free Comic Book Day of 2011 and contained an exclusive story "Let Me Tell You About Bruce Wayne".

The story has Batman and the Flash teaming up to put out fires started by Heat Wave, who has teamed up with the Firefly.  While the fight is going on, there is a charity ball in Gotham City, where some Gothamites are discussing why Bruce Wayne has not shown up with a donation.

Collected editions
Batman: The Brave and the Bold (2010-01-13): (collects #1-6)
Batman: The Brave and the Bold - The Fearsome Fang Strikes Again (2010-11-17): (collects #7-12)
Batman: The Brave and the Bold - Emerald Knight (2011-05-25): (collects #13, 14, 16, 18, 19 and 21)
The All-New Batman: The Brave and the Bold (2011-09-28): (collects #1-6)
The All-New Batman: The Brave and the Bold - Help Wanted (2012-08-22): (collects #7-12)
The All-New Batman: The Brave and the Bold - Small Miracles (2013-03-13): (collects #13-16 and Batman: The Brave and the Bold #15 and 17)
Young Justice/Batman: The Brave and the Bold (2011-05-07): released on Free Comic Book Day.

UK title

The UK version was published by Titan Magazines from March 2010 to August 2014, lasting for 55 issues. It reprinted comic strips previously featured in the original American comic book but also added extra content including puzzles, profiles and other special features. Because of these extra features, the short opening scenes from the comic strips were sometimes cut. However, this did not affect the over-all story, as the opening scenes were usually unrelated to the main story. A free gift was also added. It was Titan Magazines' third Batman comic alongside Batman Legends and DC Universe Presents Batman Superman and was the first to be aimed at a younger audience.

References

External links
DC pages: BTBATB2009, TANBTBATB2010
Titan Magazine website

2010 comics debuts
Batman: The Brave and the Bold
Batman titles